Andrea Radonjić (born 13 December 1992) is a Montenegrin beauty pageant titleholder who was crowned Miss Montenegro Universe 2011 and represented her country in the 2012 Miss Universe.

Miss Montenegro 2011 & Miss Universe 2012
Miss Montenegro 2011 beauty pageant was held at the Hotel Mediterranean in Becici on 25 August 2011. Fifteen beauties were selected to prepare a stay in the Mediterranean. Radonjić from Podgorica was crowned Miss Montenegro 2011. She represented Montenegro in the Miss Universe 2012 beauty pageant.

In 2013, she competed for Miss Zeta River.

References

External links
 Official Miss Serbia and Miss Montenegro website

Living people
Montenegrin beauty pageant winners
Miss Universe 2012 contestants
1994 births